This is a list of earthquakes in 1967. Only magnitude 6.0 or greater earthquakes appear on the list. Lower magnitude events are included if they have caused death, injury or damage. Events which occurred in remote areas will be excluded from the list as they wouldn't have generated significant media interest. All dates are listed according to UTC time. Maximum intensities are indicated on the Mercalli intensity scale and are sourced from United States Geological Survey (USGS) ShakeMap data. Another year which had below normal activity. There was 11 magnitude 7.0+ events the largest of which measured 7.4. This event which struck Turkey in July was part of a series of earthquakes across the globe which made up the bulk of the death toll of 961. Turkey itself had two destructive events within days however Venezuela had the highest death toll with 300 of the years fatalities. India was struck by a large earthquake in December which caused 180 deaths.

Overall

By death toll 

 Note: At least 10 casualties

By magnitude 

 Note: At least 7.0 magnitude

Notable events

January

February

March

April

May

June

July

August

September

October

November

December

References

1967
 
1967